The Center of the Web is a 1914 American short silent crime drama film, directed by Jack Harvey for the Thanhouser Company. It stars Claire Kroell, Frank Wood, and Samuel N. Niblack.

References

External links

The Center of the Web at the Internet Movie Database

1914 films
American silent short films
American black-and-white films
American crime drama films
1910s crime drama films
Films directed by Jack Harvey
Thanhouser Company films
1914 drama films
1910s American films
Silent American drama films